Mark Soper (born July 19, 1959) is an American actor, best known as Joseph Barringer in the television series Knots Landing and Michael Milton in The World According to Garp. Soper is from Boyertown, Pennsylvania.

Filmography

References

External links
 
 

American male soap opera actors
American male television actors
Living people
People from Boyertown, Pennsylvania
1959 births
20th-century American male actors